The MetroCard is a magnetic stripe card used for fare payment on transportation in the New York City area. It is a payment method for the New York City Subway (including the Staten Island Railway), New York City Transit buses and MTA buses. The MetroCard is also accepted by several partner agencies: Nassau Inter-County Express (NICE), the PATH train system, the Roosevelt Island Tramway, AirTrain JFK, and Westchester County's Bee-Line Bus System.

The MetroCard was introduced in 1993 to enhance the technology of the transit system and eliminate the burden of carrying and collecting tokens. The MTA discontinued the use of tokens in the subway on May 3, 2003, and on buses on December 31, 2003. 

The MetroCard is expected to be phased out by April 2024. It will be replaced by OMNY, a contactless payment system where riders pay for their fare by waving or tapping credit or debit bank cards, smartphones, or MTA-issued smart cards.

The MetroCard is managed by a division of the MTA known as Revenue Control, MetroCard Sales, which is part of the Office of the Executive Vice President.  The MetroCard Vending Machines are manufactured by Cubic Transportation Systems, Inc.

As of early 2019, the direct costs of the MetroCard system had totaled $1.5 billion.

History
The idea for a farecard with a magnetic strip for the MTA system was proposed in 1983. It was the "highest priority" for then-MTA Chairman Richard Ravitch. The card would replace the tokens that were, at the time, used to pay transit fares. This plan was generally supported by the public. In 1984, Ravitch's successor Bob Kiley said that he would try to create a system for the new farecards within the next four years. However, bureaucratic actions and disagreements delayed the rollout of the system. In March 1990, the MTA board voted to allocate funding for the magnetic fare collection system. Three months later, the New York state legislature voted to allow the MTA to proceed for its plans for the new system. By 1991, the token technology was becoming dated: almost all other transit systems were using magnetic farecards, which were found to be much cheaper than the token system. In July of that year, the MTA board approved the roll-out of the magnetic farecard system. The MTA opened a request for bids to furnish and operate the farecard system, and Cubic Transportation Systems offered the lowest bid at $100 million.

On October 30, 1992, the installation of Automated Fare Collection turnstiles began. The farecard system was given the name MetroCard by April 1993. At the time, the first subway stations were supposed to receive MetroCard-compatible turnstiles before year's end, and buses were scheduled to be retrofitted with MetroCard collection equipment by late 1995. On June 1, 1993, MTA distributed 3,000 MetroCards in the first major test of the technology for the entire subway and bus systems. Less than a year later, on January 6, 1994, MetroCard-compatible turnstiles opened at Wall Street on the IRT Lexington Avenue Line and Whitehall Street–South Ferry on the BMT Broadway Line. All MetroCard turnstiles were installed by May 14, 1997, when the entire bus and subway system accepted MetroCard.

On September 28, 1995, buses on Staten Island started accepting MetroCard, and by the end of 1995, MetroCard was accepted on all New York City Transit buses.

Before 1997, the MetroCard design was blue with yellow lettering. These blue cards are now collector's items. On July 4, 1997, the first free transfers were made available between bus and subway at any location with MetroCard. This program was originally billed as MetroCard Gold. Card colors changed to the current blue lettering on goldenrod background. On January 1, 1998, bonus free rides (10% of the purchase amount) were given for purchases of $15 or more. On July 4, six months later, 7-Day and 30-Day Unlimited Ride MetroCards were introduced, at $17 and $63 respectively. A 30-day Express Bus Plus MetroCard, allowing unlimited rides on express buses in addition to local buses and the subway, was also introduced at $120. The 1-Day Fun Pass was introduced on January 1, 1999, at a cost of $4. The debut of the MetroCard allowed the MTA to add bonus fare incentives, such as free bus transfers to other buses or subways. Half of the ridership increase between 1997 and 1999 was attributed to these incentives.

The first MetroCard Vending Machines (MVMs) were installed on January 25, 1999, in two stations, and by the end of 1999 347 MVMs were in service at 74 stations. On April 13, 2003, tokens were no longer sold. Starting May 4, 2003, tokens were no longer accepted, except on buses. The following fare increases were implemented:

 Base fare increased from $1.50 to $2.00
 1-Day Unlimited MetroCard fare increased from $4 to $7
 7-Day Unlimited MetroCard fare increased from $17 to $21
 30-day Express Bus Plus was replaced with a 7-day Express Bus Plus card, which cost $33 each.
 30-Day Unlimited MetroCard fare increased from $63 to $70
 The bonus for pay-per-ride increased to 20% of the purchase amount for purchases of $10 or more
 Tokens would be phased out, but for the next two months they acted as $1.50 credit towards a $2 bus ride.

On February 27, 2005, another fare hike occurred:
 7-day Express Bus Plus increased by $8, to $41.
 7-Day Unlimited increased by $3, to $24.
 30-Day Unlimited increased by $6, to $76.
On April 1, 2007, MetroCard started to be accepted by the Westchester Bee-Line Bus System as all of its buses were now equipped with new fareboxes that could accept MetroCard.

On March 2, 2008, another set of fare increases was implemented:
 1-Day Unlimited fare increased by 50 cents, to $7.50.
 7-Day Unlimited fare increased by $1, to $25.
 14-Day Unlimited was introduced for $47.
 30-Day Unlimited increased by $5, to $81.
 The bonus for pay-per-ride decreased to 15% of the purchase amount for purchases of $7 or more.

On June 28, 2009, the agency had its second fare hike in as many years:
 The base fare and single-ride ticket increased by 25 cents, to $2.25.
 1-Day Unlimited fare increased by 75 cents, to $8.25.
 7-Day Unlimited fare increased by $7, to $27.
 7-Day Express Bus Plus fare increased by $4, to $45.
 14-Day Unlimited fare increased by $4.50, to $51.50.
 30-Day Unlimited increased by $8, to $89.
 The minimum purchase for a pay-per-ride bonus rose to $8.

On December 30, 2010, the bonus value for Pay-Per-Ride decreased to 7% for every $10, and the 1-Day Fun Pass and the 14-Day Unlimited Ride were discontinued altogether. Additionally:
 7-Day Unlimited fare increased by $2, to $29.
 7-Day Express Bus Plus fare increased by $5, to $50.
 30-Day Unlimited fare increased by $15, to $104.

In 2012, the MTA allowed advertisements to be printed on the fronts of MetroCards. The backs of MetroCards had already been used for advertisements since 1995. This change meant that advertisers could remove the MTA logo from the fronts of MetroCards.

As a result of Hurricane Sandy in October 2012, three free transfers were offered on the MetroCard. Finally, a three-hour transfer window applied from transfers from any subway station to the Q22 or Q113 routes of MTA Bus, and then to the n31, n32, and n33 routes of NICE.
 
On December 19, 2012, the MTA voted for the following fare increases:
 Base fare and single-ride ticket increased by 25 cents, to $2.50.
 7-Day Unlimited MetroCard fare increased by $1, to $30.
 30-Day Unlimited MetroCard fare increased by $8, to $112.
 The bonus for a pay-per-ride MetroCard decreased from 7% to 5% but the cutoff for the bonus decreased from $10 to $5.

Starting February 20, 2013, people were able to refill cards with both time and value, so that when a MetroCard is filled with both an unlimited card and fare value, the unlimited ride portion is used first where applicable. If not started already, the unlimited ride period would begin when the card is next used, and when the unlimited period expires, the regular fare would be charged. On March 3, 2013, a $1 fee was imposed on new card purchases in-system in order to reduce the number of discarded MetroCards.  However, MetroCards purchased through the Extended Sales retail network carry no new card fee.

On March 22, 2015, the MTA voted for the following fare increases:
Base Fare increased by 25 cents, to $2.75;
Express Bus fare increased, to $6.50;
7-Day Unlimited fare increased by $1, to $31;
7-Day Express Bus Plus fare increased by $7.25, to $57.25;
30-Day Unlimited increased by $4.50, to $116.50;
Single Ride ticket increased by 50 cents, to $3.00; and:
 the bonus for a pay-per-ride MetroCard was increased to 11%.

On March 19, 2017, the following fare increases went into place:
 7-Day Unlimited fare increased by $1, to $32;
 7-Day Express Bus Plus fare increased by $2.25, to $59.50;
 30-Day Unlimited increased by $4.50, to $121; and
 the bonus for a pay-per-ride MetroCard was reduced from 11% to 5%.

On October 23, 2017, it was announced that the MetroCard would be phased out and replaced by OMNY, a contactless fare payment system also by Cubic, with fare payment being made using Apple Pay, Google Wallet, debit/credit cards with near-field communication enabled, or radio-frequency identification cards. All buses and subway stations would use the OMNY system by 2020. However, support of the MetroCard is slated to remain until 2023.

In mid-2018, city officials tentatively agreed to start a program in which they would provide half-fare MetroCards to almost 800,000 New York City residents living below the federal poverty line. The program would start in January 2019, and the New York City allocated $106 million in fiscal year 2019 to subsidize the half-fare MetroCards for at least six months. After uncertainty over whether the program would be implemented, the half-fare MetroCards were rolled out starting on January 4, 2019. Initially, the reduced-fare MetroCards would be rolled out to 30,000 residents, though another 130,000 New Yorkers receiving SNAP benefits would also be allowed to receive the half-fare MetroCards in April 2019. However, in the revised plan, only a portion of the originally projected 800,000 residents (around 20%) would be eligible for the reduced-fare cards.

On April 21, 2019, the following fare increases went into place:

Express Bus fare increased by 25 cents, to $6.75;
7-Day Unlimited fare increased by $1, to $33;
7-Day Express Bus Plus fare increased by $2.50, to $62;
30-Day Unlimited fare increased by $6, to $127; and
 the bonus for a pay-per-ride MetroCard was eliminated.

Technology

During a swipe, the MetroCard is read, re-written to, then check-read to verify correct encoding.

Each MetroCard stored value card is assigned a unique, permanent ten-digit serial number when it is manufactured. The value is stored magnetically on the card itself, while the card's transaction history is held centrally in the Automated Fare Collection (AFC) Database. When a card is purchased and fares are loaded onto it, the MetroCard Vending Machine or station agent's computer stores the amount of the purchase onto the card and updates the database, identifying the card by its serial number. Whenever the card is swiped at a turnstile, the value of the card is read, the new value is written, the customer is let through, and then the central database is updated with the new transaction as soon as possible. Cards are not validated in real time against the database when swiped to pay the fare. The AFC Database is necessary to maintain transaction records to track a card if needed. It has actually been used to acquit criminal suspects by placing them away from the scene of a crime. The database also stores a list of MetroCards that have been invalidated for various reasons (such as lost or stolen student or unlimited monthly cards), and it distributes the list to turnstiles in order to deny access to a revoked card.

The older blue MetroCards were not capable of the many kinds of fare options that the gold ones currently offer. The format of the magnetic stripe used by the blue MetroCard offered very little other than the standard pay-per-swipe fare. Also, gold MetroCards allow groups of people (up to four) to ride together using a single pay-per-swipe MetroCard. The gold MetroCard keeps track of the number of swipes at a location in order to allow those same number of people to transfer at a subsequent location, if applicable. The MetroCard system was designed to ensure backward compatibility, which allowed a smooth transition from the blue format to gold.

Cubic later used the proprietary MetroCard platform to create the Chicago Card and Tren Urbano's fare card, which are physically identical to the MetroCard except for the labeling.

Physical attributes 

Dimensions: ;  thickness
Material: Polyester

Card types

SingleRide Ticket

The SingleRide Ticket (introduced to replace subway tokens and single cash fares) is a piece of paper with a magnetic strip on the front, and with the date and time of purchase stamped on the back.  They cost $3.00 for one subway or local bus ride, with one free transfer allowed between buses, issued by the bus operator upon request. SingleRide Tickets do not allow transfers between subways and buses.  SingleRide tickets can only be purchased at MetroCard Vending Machines, which are usually located within subway stations, and expire two hours from time of purchase. Because of these limitations, SingleRide Tickets are not frequently used, having been used by only 3% of subway riders in 2009.

Although the Pay-Per-Ride MetroCard is accepted on PATH, the regular SingleRide ticket is not. However, a PATH SingleRide ticket is available from MVMs in PATH stations for $2.75, valid for 2 hours and only on PATH. PATH also accepts 2-Trip PATH MetroCards, which cost $5.50 and are also valid only on PATH.

Pay-Per-Ride MetroCard
The Pay-Per-Ride MetroCard can be filled with an initial value in any increment between $5.50 and $80, though vending machines only sell values in multiples of 5 cents. Cards can be refilled in 1 cent increments at station booths (formerly called token booths), and in 5 cent increments at vending machines. A MetroCard holder can spend up to $80 in one transaction and up to a total value of $100. Pay-Per-Ride MetroCards can also be filled with unlimited ride time in 7- or 30-day increments.

The Pay-Per Ride MetroCard is accepted on the New York City Subway; MTA express, local, limited, and Select buses; and the Staten Island Railway. Outside agencies also accept the MetroCard, including the Staten Island express bus routes operated by the Nassau Inter-County Express; the PATH, operated by the Port Authority of New York and New Jersey; the AirTrain JFK, operated by the Port Authority; the Roosevelt Island Tramway; and the Westchester County Bee-Line Bus System. However, PATH does not accept reduced fare MetroCard.

Pay-Per-Ride MetroCards deduct different values depending on which service is used. Subway, Staten Island Railway, Roosevelt Island Tramway, or local/limited/Select bus uses, cost $2.75 per trip and usually allow one valid transfer, though two transfers may be allowed depending on which routes are being used (see below). Although the PATH charges $2.75 as well, it does not offer any free transfers. A ride on an MTA express bus costs $6.50, with transfers allowed to or from the subway, Staten Island Railway, or non-express MTA buses. The BxM4C Bee-Line Bus deducts $7.50 per trip, and no free or discounted transfers are allowed to or from that route.  The AirTrain JFK costs $7.75 per trip if the passenger enters or leaves at Jamaica or Howard Beach–JFK Airport stations.

Transfers are available within two hours of initial entry, with the following structure:
 One free transfer from
 subway to local bus
 bus to subway
 bus to local bus
 express bus to express bus
 bus or subway to Staten Island Railway
 subway to subway between the Lexington Avenue–59th Street stations and the Lexington Avenue–63rd Street station or between Junius Street station and Livonia Avenue station
 Two consecutive free transfers are available with the MetroCard for certain transfers. The transfers must be made within two hours of each other (e.g. when one makes the first transfer, they have two hours to make the second transfer).
 Between Staten Island bus routes crossing the Staten Island Railway, through St. George Ferry Terminal, and then any MTA local bus or NYC subway service below Fulton Street in Lower Manhattan.
 Between certain bus routes as specified in 
 $3.75 for each local bus or subway to express bus transfer.
 Transfers with coins (pennies and half-dollar coins not accepted) are good for use on one connecting local bus route (restrictions apply).
 Customers transferring to suburban buses from another system with a lower base fare must pay the difference between the fare on the first bus and the fare on the second bus.
 No transfers to the BxM4C.
 No free transfer between PATH and NYC Subway, Bus and MTA Bus.
 Up to 4 people can ride together on a single Pay-Per-Ride MetroCard, with one free transfer granted.

Card balance may be transferred to a new card at any station booth, up to one year after expiration. Card balances from multiple cards may also be combined at station booths. Expired cards can also be replaced at vending machines, or by mailing the MetroCard to the MTA up to two years after expiration.

EasyPayXPress MetroCard
The EasyPayXPress MetroCard functions like a pay per ride or unlimited MetroCard, but is automatically refilled from a linked credit or debit card. An EasyPayXpress account is opened with either $30 or a 30-day unlimited balance of $121. , another $45 is automatically added for Pay-Per-Ride customers when balance drops below $20. To reduce this, a one-time payment may be made online before the balance drops below $20. All rules for standard pay per ride or unlimited cards apply, and EasyPay customers can review the account and ride usage online. Reduced-fare EasyPay version converts from Pay-Per-Ride to Unlimited rides (during that billing cycle) once the value of fares used meet or exceed the cost of a reduced-fare 30-Day Unlimited Ride card. Express bus fares do not contribute, and EasyPay cannot be used on PATH trains.

AirTrain JFK Discount MetroCard
The AirTrain JFK Discount MetroCard offers 10 trips on AirTrain JFK at $25. This card can only be purchased at specially marked MetroCard Vending Machines. It can be refilled, and once done so, becomes a Pay-Per-Ride MetroCard. However, although the AirTrain fare is also payable using a regular Pay-Per-Ride MetroCard, no discount is given for Pay-Per-Ride cards. There is also an unlimited-ride 30-day card that costs $40 and is only valid on AirTrain JFK.

Unlimited MetroCard
, four types of Unlimited-ride MetroCards are sold:
 7-Day Unlimited Ride Card, $33 for unlimited subway and local bus rides until midnight on the seventh day following first usage.
 30-Day Unlimited Ride Card, $127 for unlimited subway and local bus rides until midnight on the thirtieth day following first usage.
 7-Day Express Bus Plus Card, $62 for unlimited express bus, local bus, and subway rides until midnight on the seventh day following first usage.
 30-Day AirTrain JFK Unlimited Ride Card, $40 for unlimited trips on the AirTrain (operated by the Port Authority of New York and New Jersey) until midnight on the thirtieth day from first usage. This card can only be purchased at specially marked MetroCard Vending Machines at the Howard Beach–JFK Airport or Sutphin Boulevard–Archer Avenue–JFK Airport stations and at MetroCard vendors in JFK Airport. There are no transfer privileges with this card as it only works on the AirTrain. This is the only unlimited card accepted on the AirTrain.

Any Unlimited Ride Card cannot be used at the same subway station or bus route for 18 minutes after it is swiped. Every MetroCard can be refilled in increments of 7 or 30 days' worth of unlimited ride time, or with pay-per-ride value, but time is used before value unless the time on the card cannot be applied to the ride taken. The 7 Day Express Bus Plus card is the only unlimited card that can be used on express buses. Unlimited rides cannot be applied to non-MTA transit systems such as the PATH or AirTrain JFK; to use these systems that require a value-based fare, riders can load money on their Unlimited Ride MetroCard by selecting "Add Value" when refilling at a MetroCard Vending Machine or at a station booth. Turnstiles for these systems will simply deduct the fare from the value portion of the MetroCard. 30-Day Unlimited and 7-Day Express Bus Plus Cards that are purchased using a credit, debit or ATM card from a MetroCard vending machine can be reported lost or stolen to receive a pro-rated credit for the card.

Standard 7- and 30-day unlimited cards are accepted on MTA New York City Subway; non-express buses from either the MTA, NICE, or Bee-Line; the Roosevelt Island Tramway; and the Staten Island Railway. 7-Day Express Bus Plus is accepted on MTA express buses. The AirTrain JFK only accepts the Unlimited AirTrain JFK card.

Student MetroCard

The Student MetroCard is issued to New York City public and private school students who live within the city limits. It allows free access to the NYCT buses and trains, depending on the distance traveled between their school and their home. The card program is managed by the NYCDOE Office of Pupil Transportation. In Nassau County, Student MetroCards are issued by individual schools which have pre-paid for the cards.

The DOE issues different colors of cards to students who live in New York City. Orange cards are given to students who are in grade K-6. Green cards are given to students who are in grades 7-12. Student MetroCards are allowed on the New York City Subway, non-express MTA buses, and the Staten Island Railway. Formerly, there was also a half-fare card that could only be used on non-express buses, discontinued in mid-2019. Red cards are issued to students and parents when there is a school bus work stoppage. Blue and purple cards are issued to Nassau County students and are only allowed to use the cards on NICE buses. Up to three trips per day may be made on student MetroCards, though four-trip MetroCards can be authorized individually for students who must make more than one transfer between home and school.

Students who receive a student MetroCard must live:

 More than 0.5 miles away if they are in grades K-2
 More than 1.0 miles away if they are in grades 3-6
 More than 1.5 miles away if they are in grades 7-12

In May 2019, the MTA voted to phase out the half-fare student MetroCard and distribute only full-fare cards for students who qualify for a MetroCard.

Disabled/Senior Citizen Reduced-Fare MetroCard

Senior citizen MetroCards are received via application or by submitting the application in person with required ID and copies of proof of age at the NYC Transit Customer Service Center at 3 Stone St in lower Manhattan and act as a combination photo ID and MetroCard. It allows half-fare within the MTA system, and on express buses during off-peak hours only. Half fare is also available on the 7-day and 30-day Unlimited MetroCards. "Autogate" cards are issued to persons with mobility impairments and are accepted at wheelchair doors at selected stations. The card back is color-coded to indicate the gender of the card holder, and the card face is marked with "Photo ID Pass". Later issues of Senior Citizen and Disability MetroCards are uncolored (all white with black printing on back with photo, gold face remains unchanged) for gender neutral requests.
Temporary replacement cards are purple with no photo, or blue for Autogate MetroCard holders, and the value cannot be refunded if the original card is stolen or lost. A Senior & Disabled Reduced-fare EasyPay (automatic refill) card is also available.

This type of card is accepted everywhere the Pay-Per-Ride or time-based MetroCard is, with two exceptions: it is not valid on the PATH, and it is not valid for ticket purchase on New York City-bound LIRR and Metro-North trains in the morning. Reduced-Fare MetroCards (in any variety) are also not accepted at PATH stations. Reduced fare customers who do not have a MetroCard may purchase a full-fare round trip MetroCard from a subway station agent by presenting proof of eligibility.

This type of card caused complaints because it took up to three months to replace.

Fair Fares MetroCard 
The Fair Fares MetroCard pilot program was implemented in January 2019. These are distributed by Fair Fares NYC, which sends letters to eligible residents that meet the income criteria, including veteran students, New York City Housing Authority residents, City University of New York students, and residents who receive benefits from the Department of Social Services. These residents must then register online to receive the Fair Fare MetroCard. Holders of the Fair Fare MetroCard can purchase Pay-Per-Ride or time-based fares at half the regular price. This type of card is accepted only on local/limited/Select buses, the subway, and the Staten Island Railway.

Emergency Services
An emergency MetroCard is carried by police officers, firefighters, and emergency medical personnel while on duty so they can access the subway system during an emergency.

Fares

MetroCard Bus Transfer
The MetroCard Bus Transfer is issued upon request to passengers who pay cash fares on buses accepting MetroCard. The transfer is inserted into the fare box on the second bus, which retains it. Westchester Bee Line bus system and Nassau Inter-County Express and MTA New York City Transit bus is free to transfer from one bus to another bus that is accepted with MetroCard. The bus transfer is paper like the SingleRide Metrocard. This transfer does not grant cash customers subway access.

For suburban transfers, if the fare paid to get the transfer is less than that required on the second bus, the difference must be paid on boarding. For transfers from NICE to New York City Transit, no step up fee is required.

The predecessor to the MetroCard bus transfer was the original bus transfer. These paper tickets allowed bus to bus transfers. Available in pads of several different colors for use at different times, boroughs or directions, they would be torn at a certain time-marked line to indicate when the transfer would expire. A version of this still exists today as the "General Order Transfer" (aka "block ticket") which is provided to customers as they leave the subway system during service disruptions to re-enter the system at another point (often via a shuttle bus).

Purchase options
All new MetroCard purchases are charged a $1 fee, except to reduced fare customers and those exchanging damaged/expired cards. This purchase fee does not apply to MetroCard refills.

Subway station booths
Booths staffed by MTA station agents (at specified time periods) are located in all MTA subway stations. Every type of MetroCard can be purchased at a booth, with the exception of the SingleRide ticket (purchased at the MetroCard Vending Machine) and MetroCards specific to other transit systems (AirTrain JFK and PATH). All booth transactions must be in cash.

MetroCard vending machines

MetroCard Vending Machines (MVMs) are located in all subway stations, PATH stations (with the added ability to reload SmartLink cards), Staten Island Ferry terminals, Roosevelt Island Tramway stations, and the Hempstead Transit Center, Eltingville Transit Center, and Central Terminal at LaGuardia Airport.

MVMs debuted on January 25, 1999, and are found in two models. Standard MVMs accept cash, credit cards, and debit cards, and are located in every subway station. Cash transactions are required for purchases of less than $1, and they can return up to $9 in coin change. MVMs can also reload previously-issued MetroCards. MetroCard Express Machines (MEMs) are smaller MVMs that only accept credit and ATM/debit cards. Both models allow customers to purchase any type of MetroCard through a touchscreen. The machines also comply with the Americans with Disabilities Act of 1990, through use of Braille and a headset jack: audible commands for each menu item are provided once a headset is connected and the proper sequence is keyed through the keypad; all non-visual commands are then entered via the keypad instead of the touchscreen. PATH fare vending machines can dispense MetroCards.

MetroCard bus and van

A number of MetroCard sales vans and a MetroCard bus (a retired bus converted for sales duty) routinely travel to specific locations in New York City and Westchester County, stopping for a day (or half a day) at the announced locations. MetroCards can be purchased or refilled directly from these vehicles. Reduced-fare MetroCard applications can also be processed on the bus, including taking photographs for these cards.

The MetroCard van serves all five boroughs and Westchester County, while the MetroCard bus serves Manhattan, the Bronx, Queens, and parts of Brooklyn.

Neighborhood MetroCard merchants
Vendors can apply to sell MTA fare media at their business. Only presealed, prevalued cards are available, and no fee is charged. A comprehensive listing of neighborhood MetroCard merchants can be found on the MTA website.

Commuter railroad ticket vending machines
Ticket vending machines (TVMs) for the MTA's two commuter railroad systems, Long Island Rail Road and Metro-North Railroad, offer the option to purchase combined tickets/passes and MetroCards. A $5.50 MetroCard is available with a round-trip ticket, and a $50 MetroCard is available with a monthly pass. In addition, the machines sell separate $25 MetroCards. TVMs at Jamaica station and Penn Station sell AirTrain JFK monthly passes on the back of LIRR tickets. All cards sold from these machines are of thick paper stock, not the normal plastic.

Beginning in 2007, with the start of the S89 bus service, a combined Hudson–Bergen Light Rail (HBLR) monthly pass and monthly MetroCard became available at NJ Transit ticket vending machines at HBLR stations.

Future
In 2006, the MTA and Port Authority announced plans to replace the magnetic strip with smart cards.

On July 1, 2006, MTA launched a six-month pilot program to test the new contact-less smart card fare collection system, initially ending on December 31, 2006, but extended until May 31, 2007. This program was tested at all stations on the IRT Lexington Avenue Line and at four stations in the Bronx, Brooklyn and Queens. The testing system utilized Citibank MasterCard's Paypass keytags. This smart card system was intended to ease congestion near the fare control area by reducing time spent paying for fare. MTA and other transportation authorities in the region said they would eventually implement it system-wide.

OMNY 

In October 2017, MTA signed a $573 million contract with Cubic Transportation Systems for OMNY (short for One Metro New York), a new fare payment system. This will use the contactless payment system, with riders waving or tapping credit or debit bank cards, smartphones, and/or MTA-issued smart cards to pay their fare. This contactless system was originally developed by Transport for London at a cost of £11 million (at the time equivalent to around $14 million), before being licensed to Cubic for worldwide sale. MTA expects to spend at least six years rolling out the system, with new electronic readers and vending machines. The new fare system would be rolled out on a limited basis in May 2019. By 2024, the MetroCard would be phased out entirely.

Unauthorized resale and scams

The MetroCard system is susceptible to various types of unauthorized resale, colloquially known as "selling swipes".

At times, this may involve individuals charging to swipe another commuter into the subway system at a discount below the official fare, either by using an "unlimited ride" MetroCard, or by manipulating a spent MetroCard to obtain an extra, unpaid ride. A 2004 press release from New York State Senator Martin J. Golden claims these behaviors cost the MTA $260,000 a year.

So-called 'swipers' reportedly may secure customers by maliciously damaging the coin and bill acceptor mechanisms of metrocard vending machines  Nearly half of broken vending machines were in Manhattan, and the MTA spent $26.5 million on MVM repairs as of 2017. An 18-minute delay between uses of an "unlimited ride" MetroCard at any given station, and the expense of unlimited ride MetroCards, have historically limited their use for selling swipes.

More commonly, "swipers" use a technique which involves bending a spent MetroCard in a precise way that then allows a further use of that MetroCard when swiped and unkinked according to a specific procedure at a turnstile. Swipers employ this procedure to sell discount entry to the subway; some riders simply use the technique to garner free subway entry themselves. The bend purportedly damages the magnetic stripe on the MetroCard which indicates it no longer has value, prompting the turnstile reader to defer to a back-up field which indicates that the metrocard has one remaining fare.  When the technique was discovered, it could be performed an unlimited number of times with the same MetroCard. However, a software correction soon limited the technique to just once per used MetroCard, in which a turnstile computer which had deferred to that "backup" field would require the MetroCard be swiped additional times through the reader/writer before granting entry so any lingering indication of value could be deleted from the card, making it impossible to manipulate a given MetroCard in the same way once again.

Criminal charges leveled against those using this bent-MetroCard technique have included petit larceny and, in a state law introduced specifically to target swipers in the year 2006, with "unauthorized sale of transportation services." As early as 2001, however, police and prosecutors began to charge people bending MetroCards to seek free rides (either to sell, or for personal use) with various forms of forgery.

While misdemeanor forgery charges have been used in a number of jurisdictions, the Manhattan District Attorney's Office championed felony forgery charges for those in possession of manipulated metrocards, including "criminal possession of a 'forged instrument' in the 2nd Degree", a felony. A representative of that office successfully defended the charge to the state's highest court, the New York State Court of Appeals, in a case decided in 2009. Critics have argued, however, that the court's decision is based on an incomplete—and possibly incorrect—understanding of MetroCard technology, calling to question the status of a bent metrocard as a "forged instrument". The MetroCard technology has no public documentation, and has never been made available to criminal defendants who might dispute claims that a simple bend to a MetroCard alters its data as read by a turnstile computer in the way claimed by Manhattan prosecutors. It is unclear, for example, why a bent MetroCard cannot be used to obtain an unpaid ride on a New York City bus if simply bending a MetroCard can actually alter how it is read by a subway turnstile computer as prosecutors claim. One researcher has argued that a bent MetroCard must be subject to further procedures in order to be seen by the turnstile computer as legitimate, which requires both concealing data from the turnstile computer with a bend, as well as having fresh data written to the MetroCard by the turnstile computer itself. Because a bent MetroCard will not actually appear legitimate to a turnstile computer without further steps to allow the turnstile computer to write that fresh data, this casts doubt on the claim that a bent MetroCard - often cited as evidence in the prosecutions of swipers - actually constitutes a "forged instrument" as defined in New York State law.

A $1 fee on new MetroCards imposed in 2013 significantly curtailed the bent-MetroCard form of selling swipes. The fee incentivized riders to keep and refill their existing MetroCards, undermining the vast supply of discarded spent MetroCards from which swipers previously drew as their stock-in-trade. Nonetheless, people continue to sell swipes of bent MetroCards which have been discarded.  Swipers continue to be prosecuted under forgery laws, according to research published in 2019.

The MetroCard has resisted digital duplication through software. The MetroCard has a magnetic stripe, but both the track offsets and the encoding differ from standard Magstripe cards. It is a proprietary format developed by the contractor Cubic. Off-the-shelf reader/writers for the standard cards are useless to read from or write to MetroCards without mechanical modification and custom software. Self-identified hackers have had success decoding MetroCard data by treating Metrocard contents as sound, and converting its contents to binary using a computer sound card, inferring the role of data fields by comparing MetroCards with known properties, and developing custom Linux software to decode MetroCard data. Moreover, MetroCard data has been duplicated to other media, also by treating it as sound, using an eight-track tape player. While duplicates may be usable to enter the subway in the short term, they are likely to be invalidated after the AFC database discovers imbalance between fares purchased for a MetroCard with a certain serial number, and fares used from one or more MetroCards bearing that serial number.

Limited editions
Over the years, the MTA has issued limited-edition MetroCards in honor of certain events, people, or structures.

Back side designs 

For much of the MetroCard's history, images were printed only on the back side of MetroCards. These have included cards with the Statue of Liberty, the New York City bid for the 2012 Summer Olympics, a Solomon R. Guggenheim Museum exhibit, and the Circle Line ferry. Sporting events have also been commemorated, including the Subway Series, the 2014 Super Bowl, and the 2014–15 season of the Brooklyn Nets.

In 2017, the MTA started issuing Supreme-branded MetroCards at eight subway stations. The Supreme-branded cards proved popular, and there were reports that some were resold for hundreds of dollars.

Front side designs 

The MTA started allowing front side advertising in 2012. One of the earlier front side designs was an I Love New York card first sold in October 2013. Three hundred thousand cards were printed in remembrance of Hurricane Sandy the previous year.

Starting in December 2018, the MTA started issuing 250,000 Game of Thrones-themed MetroCards at Grand Central–42nd Street, in honor of the show's final season. The cards came in four designs.

Starting in May 2019, coinciding with the opening of the Memorial Glade at the National September 11 Memorial & Museum, the MTA issued 250,000 MetroCards with images of first responders at the World Trade Center site after 9/11. The MetroCards were issued at ten subway stations: six in Lower Manhattan and four high-traffic stations in midtown and Brooklyn.

In June 2019, the MTA celebrated Stonewall 50 - WorldPride NYC 2019 with LGBT pride-themed MetroCards.

In November 2020, the MTA celebrated Veterans Day with Veterans Day themed MetroCards. The MetroCards were available at six stations: two in Brooklyn, one in Queens, two in Midtown Manhattan, and one in The Bronx.

Notes

References

External links
 
 

Fare collection systems in the United States
Bus transportation in New York City
Products introduced in 1993
Metropolitan Transportation Authority
New York City Subway fare payment
Vending machines
MTA Regional Bus Operations
PATH (rail system)

de:New York City Subway#Tokens und MetroCard